Trudolyubivka is a village in Beryslav Raion, Kherson Oblast, southern Ukraine, about  northeast from the centre of Kherson city.

History 
The village came under attack by Russian forces in 2022, during the Russian invasion of Ukraine.

Demographics
The settlement had 282 inhabitants in 2001. The native language distribution as of the Ukrainian Census of 2001 was:
 Ukrainian: 97.45%
 Russian: 2.19%
 Belarusian: 0.36%

References

Villages in Beryslav Raion